The Arrangement is an American competitive reality television series featuring ten floral arrangers. The contestants face challenges in each episode to win the title of "America's Best Floral Designer" and win a prize package of a Smart Fortwo Passion Coupe and $25,000. The series began airing on Logo on October 4, 2010. Gigi Levangie Grazer and celebrity floral arranger Eric Buterbaugh host and serve as judges.

In each episode the designers face a "Seedling Challenge" followed by a "Weedout Challenge". The bottom designers face a final head-to-head challenge after which a designer is eliminated.

Contestants
 Gloria Baker, Chicago, Illinois
 Jenny Barker, Redondo Beach, California
 Tara Cottrell, Pasadena, California
 Guillermo del Pero, Pasadena, California
 Bonnie Kim, Los Angeles, California
 Anil Pacheco, Orange County, California
 Russ Phillip, Chicago, Illinois
 Derek Woodruff, Traverse City, Michigan
 Tenley Young, Burbank, California
 Eddie Zaratsian, Los Angeles, California

Contestant progress

 (WINNER) The designer won the competition.
 (RUNNER-UP) The designer received second place.
 (WIN) The designer or design team was the winner of the episode's Weedout Challenge.
 (HIGH) The designer was considered for the win/performed well in the episode's Weedout Challenge.
 (IN) The designer advanced to the next challenge.
 (BOTTOM 2) The designer was up for elimination.
 (OUT) The designer was eliminated from the competition.

Episodes

Episode 1
original airdate October 4, 2010
 Seedling Challenge: In teams of two, create arrangements on nude sushi models.
 Seedling Challenge winners: Guillermo and Jenny
 Weedout Challenge: In teams of five led by Guillermo and Jenny, decorate two human figures entirely with natural materials to capture the Americana at Brand experience.
 Weedout Challenge winners: Jenny's team
 Up for Elimination: Bonnie, Derek
 Eliminated: Bonnie

Episode 2
original airdate October 11, 2010
 Seedling Challenge: Create a bouquet that "packs a punch" and decorate a superhero mask.
 Seedling Challenge winner: Eddie
 Weedout Challenge: Design a "horrifically beautiful" arrangement suitable for the Jigsaw Killer from the Saw franchise.
 Weedout Challenge winner: Guillermo
 Up for Elimination: Gloria, Jenny
 Eliminated: Gloria

Episode 3
original airdate October 18, 2010
 Seedling Challenge: Take unattractive bouquets and remake them into new ones for humorous special occasions.
 Seedling Challenge winner: Anil
 Weedout Challenge: Create eco-friendly arrangements out of recycled flowers and organic produce for a "green carpet" event. With 30 minutes left contestants were tasked to create a second arrangement out of fresh flowers and plants and select one to be judged.
 Weedout Challenge winner: Derek
 Up for Elimination: Eddie, Russ
 Eliminated: Russ

Episode 4
original airdate October 25, 2010
 Seedling Challenge: Make flowers out of fabric.
 Seedling Challenge winner: Eddie
 Weedout Challenge: Each designer is assigned a couture dress designed by Nick Verreos for which to design a floral headpiece. They each also design a headpiece for the same cocktail dress.
 Weedout Challenge winner: Tara
 Up for Elimination: Anil, Jenny
 Eliminated: Jenny

Episode 5
original airdate November 1, 2010
 Seedling Challenge: Create an underwater arrangement.
 Seedling Challenge winner: Derek
 Weedout Challenge: Design a casket display for the funeral of Omarosa Manigault-Stallworth. With 30 minutes left designers are instructed to make a stand-up display from silk flowers.
 Weedout Challenge winner: Anil
 Up for Elimination: Eddie, Tara
 Eliminated: Eddie

Episode 6
original airdate November 10, 2010
 Seedling Challenge: Design an arrangement around a woman's shoe.
 Seedling Challenge winner: Anil
 Weedout Challenge: Style a photoshoot celebrating flowers on television. Models for the shoots are the professors from RuPaul's Drag U.
 Weedout Challenge winner: Tenley
 Up for Elimination: Anil, Tara
 Eliminated: Anil

Episode 7
original airdate November 17, 2010
 Seedling Challenge: Create an arrangement inspired by the personal body art of a professional tattooist.
 Seedling Challenge winner: Derek
 Weedout Challenge: After consulting with brand manager Kym Gold, co-founder of True Religion, design a floral wrap for the panels of a Smart car that incorporates the designer's brand.
 Weedout Challenge winner: Guillermo
 Up for Elimination: Tara, Tenley
 Eliminated: Tara

Episode 8
original airdate November 24, 2010
 Seedling Challenge: Unique rose arrangement 
 Seedling Challenge winner: Derek 
 Weedout Challenge: Wedding floral arrangements, bouquet, dress and boutonniere. 
 Eliminated: Derek
 Final two: Guillermo, Tenley 
 Winner: Tenley

References

External links
 Official site
 The Arrangement at the Internet Movie Database

Logo TV original programming
2010 American television series debuts
2010s American reality television series
2010 American television series endings